Arsapnia is a genus of small winter stoneflies in the family Capniidae. There are about eight described species in Arsapnia.

The genus Arsapnia was originally described in 1897, but was considered a synonym of Capnia. Arsapnia was re-established in 2014 by Murányi, et al., for eight species of Capnia.

Species
These eight species, formerly members of Capnia, now belong to the genus Arsapnia:
 Arsapnia arapahoe (Nelson & Kondratieff, 1988)
 Arsapnia coyote (Nelson & Baumann, 1987)
 Arsapnia decepta Banks, 1897
 Arsapnia pileata (Jewett, 1966)
 Arsapnia sequoia (Nelson & Baumann, 1987)
 Arsapnia teresa (Claassen, 1924)
 Arsapnia tumida (Claassen, 1924)
 Arsapnia utahensis (Gaufin & Jewett, 1962)

References

Further reading

 
 

Plecoptera